Canapé is a television show on CUNY TV. The show premiered in September, 1997.

Canapé is the only program entirely devoted to French cultural events in New York and the United States.

This monthly half-hour show includes exhibitions, film releases, book translations, festivals, ballets, concerts and theater productions.

Canapé is one of the few French programs to appear on American television.

Canapé has received three nominations for a New York Emmy Award in the category of Arts Programming in 2003, 2004 and 2007.

The show is produced by CUNY TV and the Cultural Services of the French Embassy.

City University of New York